The Terengganu Polygon Cycling Team is a Malaysian UCI Continental cycling team founded in 2011, and sponsored by PanGlobal Insurance, Science in Sport, Merpati, Castrol and Amerstrand Engineering.

Team roster

Major wins

2011
Stage 4 Jelajah Malaysia, Anuar Manan
Stage 5 Tour de Taiwan, Shinichi Fukushima
Stage 7b Tour de Singkarak, Jang Chan-jae
 Road Race Championships, Mohd Shahrul Mat Amin
Overall Tour de Brunei, Shinichi Fukushima
Stage 2, Anuar Manan
Stage 3, Harrif Saleh
Stage 4, Mohd Shahrul Mat Amin
Stage 7 Tour de Indonesia, Mohd Shahrul Mat Amin
Stages 8 & 10 Tour de Indonesia, Shinichi Fukushima
Stage 5 Tour of Hainan, Anuar Manan
2012
 Road Race Championships, Mohd Zamri Saleh
 Road Race Championships, Jang Chan-jae
Stage 5 Tour of Thailand, Mohammad Saufi Mat Senan
Stage 3 Tour de Korea, Jang Chan-jae
Stages 1 & 6 Jelajah Malaysia, Shinichi Fukushima
Stage 3 Jelajah Malaysia, Mohd Shahrul Mat Amin
Stages 4 & 5 Jelajah Malaysia, Harrif Saleh
Stage 7 Tour de Singkarak, Mohd Zamri Saleh
Stage 4 Tour de East Java, Mohd Zamri Saleh
Stage 1 Tour de Brunei, Mohd Nor Umardi Rosdi
Stage 4 Tour de Brunei, Harrif Saleh
Stage 5 Tour de Brunei, Mohd Zamri Saleh
Stage 2 Tour of Hainan, Mohammad Saufi Mat Senan
Stage 5 Tour of Vietnam, Harrif Saleh
2013
Stage 3 Tour de Taiwan, Mohd Shahrul Mat Amin
 Road Race Championships, Mohd Shahrul Mat Amin
Stage 3 Jelajah Malaysia, Harrif Saleh
Stage 3 Tour of Borneo, Harrif Saleh
CFI International Race I, Nur Amirul Fakhruddin Mazuki
CFI International Race II, Anwar Azis Muhd Shaiful
CFI International Race III, Mohd Nor Umardi Rosdi
2014
Stage 4 Tour of Thailand, Maarten de Jonge
 Time Trial Championships, Muradjan Khalmuratov
Stage 4 Sharjah International Cycling Tour, Harrif Saleh
Stages 2 & 3 Jelajah Malaysia, Mohd Zamri Saleh
Stage 5 Jelajah Malaysia, Harrif Saleh
2015
Stage 3 Tour de Filipinas, Harrif Saleh
 Road Race Championships, Nur Amirul Fakhruddin Mazuki
South East Asian Games Road Race, Mohd Zamri Saleh
Stage 4 Tour of Borneo, Nur Amirul Fakhruddin Mazuki
Stages 3 & 5 Jelajah Malaysia, Anuar Manan
2016
U23 Asian Time Trial Championships, Maral-Erdene Batmunkh
Stages 3 & 4 Tour of Thailand, Harrif Saleh
 Time Trial Championships, Goh Choon Huat
 Road Race Championships, Mohd Zamri Saleh
 Time Trial Championships, Mohd Nor Umardi Rosdi
Overall Tour de Flores, Daniel Whitehouse
Stage 2, Daniel Whitehouse
 Time Trial Championships, Maral-Erdene Batmunkh
Stage 8 Tour de Singkarak, Mohd Shahrul Mat Amin
2017
Stage 1 Tour de Filipinas, Daniel Whitehouse
Stage 2, Tour de Tochigi, Maral-Erdene Batmunkh
Stage 4 Tour de Lombok, Mohd Shahrul Mat Amin
 Time Trial Championships, Goh Choon Huat
 Road Race Championships, Goh Choon Huat
 Time Trial Championships, Maral-Erdene Batmunkh
Stage 1 Tour de Flores, Drew Morey
Stage 1 Jelajah Malaysia, Nur Amirul Fakhruddin Mazuki
Stage 2 Jelajah Malaysia, Adiq Husainie Othman
Stage 5 Jelajah Malaysia, Harrif Saleh
2018
Overall Tour de Langkawi, Artem Ovechkin
Stage 5, Artem Ovechkin
Stage 1 Tour de Lombok, Metkel Eyob
Stage 3 Sri Lanka T-Cup, Harrif Saleh
Stage 4 Tour de Filipinas, Metkel Eyob
Stage 4 (ITT) Tour of China II, Artem Ovechkin
2019
Stage 4 The Princess Maha Chakri Sirindhorn's Cup, Maral-Erdene Batmunkh
Stage 2 Tour de Langkawi, Harrif Saleh
 Team Time Trial Championships, Goh Choon Huat
 Time Trial Championships, Artem Ovechkin
Oita Urban Classic, Drew Morey
Stage 4 Tour de Indonesia, Metkel Eyob
Prologue Tour of China II, Artem Ovechkin
Overall Tour de Siak, Nur Amirul Fakhruddin Mazuki
Points classification, Nur Amirul Fakhruddin Mazuki
Stage 1, Nur Amirul Fakhruddin Mazuki
Stage 1 Tour de Ijen, Maral-Erdene Batmunkh
Stage 2 Tour of Azerbaijan (Iran), Youcef Reguigui
Stage 3 Tour of Peninsular, Nur Amirul Fakhruddin Mazuki
2020
Stages 5 & 7 Tour de Langkawi, Harrif Saleh
 Time Trial Championships, Artem Ovechkin
 Time Trial Championships, Maral-Erdene Batmunkh
 Time Trial Championships, Christofer Jurado
 Road Race Championships, Christofer Jurado
2021
GP Manavgat, Mohd Hariff Saleh
Grand Prix Velo Alanya, Carlos Quintero
Grand Prix Gündoğmuş, Carlos Quintero
Kahramanmaraş Grand Prix Road Race, Jambaljamts Sainbayar
 Overall Tour of Thailand, Jambaljamts Sainbayar
2022
Stage 6 Tour du Rwanda, Anatoliy Budyak
Grand Prix Mediterranean, Anatoliy Budyak
Grand Prix Gündoğmuş, Anatoliy Budyak
Stages 3 & 4 Tour of Thailand, Harrif Saleh
Stage 5 Tour de Taiwan, Harrif Saleh

Continental & national champions

2011
 Malaysia Road Race, Mohamed Mat Amin
2012
 Malaysia Road Race, Mohamed Zamri Salleh
 South Korea Road Race, Jang Chan-Jae
2013
 Malaysia Road Race, Mohd Shahrul Mat Amin
2014
 Uzbekistan Time Trial, Muradjan Halmuratov
2015
 Malaysia Road Race, Nur Amirul Fakhruddin Marzuki
2016
 Singapore Time Trial, Choon Huat Goh
 Malaysia Road Race, Mohd Zamri Saleh
 Malaysia Time Trial, Mohd Nor Umardi Rosdi
 Mongolia Time Trial, Maral-erdene Batmunkh
2017
 Singapore Time Trial, Choon Huat Goh
 Singapore Road Race, Choon Huat Goh
 Mongolia Time Trial, Maral-erdene Batmunkh
2018
African Team Time Trial, Metkel Eyob
 Singapore Time Trial, Choon Huat Goh
 Singapore Road Race, Choon Huat Goh
 Mongolia Time Trial, Maral-erdene Batmunkh
2019
 Singapore Team Time Trial, Choon Huat Goh
 Singapore Time Trial, Choon Huat Goh
  Russia Time Trial, Artem Ovechkin
 Algeria Time Trial, Youcef Reguigui
 Singapore Road Race, Choon Huat Goh
 Malaysia Road Race, Nur Amirul Fakhruddin Marzuki
 Africa Continental Time Trial, Youcef Reguigui
2020
  Russia Time Trial, Artem Ovechkin
 Mongolia Road Race, Maral-erdene Batmunkh
 Panama Time Trial, Cristofer Jurado López
 Panama Road Race, Cristofer Jurado López

References

External links

UCI Continental Teams (Asia)
Cycling teams based in Malaysia
Cycling teams established in 2011